= N763 road (Belgium) =

Road in Belgium

The N763 is a regional road in Limburg. The road has a length of about 8 kilometers.
